Lieutenant-Colonel Sir Edmund Castell Bacon, 13th and 14th Baronet  (18 March 1903 – 30 September 1982), was a British landowner and businessman.

Baronetcy
As the Bacon baronetcy of Redgrave in the County of Suffolk is the oldest extant English baronetcy (created in the Baronetage of England on 22 May 1611), Sir Edmund was the Premier Baronet of England.

He was both the 13th and 14th Baronet of Bacon, since the 8th Bacon Baronet of Mildenhall in the County of Suffolk (created in the Baronetage of England on 29 July 1627), had succeeded as the 7th Bacon Baronet of Redgrave in 1755 when his third cousin, the 6th Bacon Baronet of Redgrave, died without heirs.

Family
Sir Edmund was born in 1903 at Raveningham Hall, the son of Sir Nicholas Bacon, 12th Baronet and Constance Alice Leslie-Melville. He was educated at Wixenford, Eton, and Trinity College, Cambridge.

On 15 January 1936, he married Priscilla Dora Ponsonby (1913–2000), daughter of Sir Charles Ponsonby, 1st Baronet, and they had five children. Bacon's daughter, Sarah, is married to Sir Paul Nicholson.

Career
Sir Edmund was appointed deputy lieutenant of Norfolk in 1939.

He commanded the 55th (Suffolk Yeomanry) Anti-Tank Regiment of the Royal Artillery in the Second World War and he was mentioned in despatches. He became Honorary Colonel of the 308 (Suffolk and Norfolk Yeomanry) Field Regiment, Royal Artillery between 1961 and 1967.

He was appointed as a justice of the peace for Norfolk in 1944. He succeeded to the family baronetcies on 1 January 1947 and he was Lord-Lieutenant of Norfolk between 1949 and 1982.
Sir Edmund held several quango and business positions: chairman of British Sugar Corporation (1957–1968); Pro-Chancellor of the University of East Anglia (1964–1973); chairman of the Agricultural North East Development Council (1966–1982) and director of Lloyds Bank.

Sir Edmund died on 30 September 1982, aged 79.

Awards and decorations
 Knight of the Venerable Order of Saint John
 Knight Commander of the Order of the British Empire (1965)
 Knight of the Order of the Garter (1970)

Further reading
Lindsay, Donald, Sir Edmund (Castell) Bacon: a Norfolk life, Maldon: Plume, 1988

References

1903 births
1982 deaths
Edmund
People from South Norfolk (district)
People educated at Eton College
People educated at Wixenford School
Alumni of Trinity College, Cambridge
People associated with the University of East Anglia
Royal Artillery officers
British Army personnel of World War II
Baronets in the Baronetage of England
Knights Commander of the Order of the British Empire
Knights of the Garter
Knights of the Order of St John
Lord-Lieutenants of Norfolk
English justices of the peace